Lomax African Methodist Episcopal Zion Church is an historic African Methodist Episcopal Zion church located at 2704 24th Rd. South in Arlington, Virginia. It was built in 1922, and is a one-story, three bay by six bay, brick church building on a parged concrete foundation.  It features two unequal-sized crenellated towers and brick buttresses along the facade and side elevations in the Late Gothic Revival style. Also on the property are two contributing resources, including a cemetery dating from circa 1894, and a parsonage built in 1951. The cemetery contains approximately 107 interments.

It was listed on the National Register of Historic Places in 2004.

References

Methodist churches in Virginia
Churches in Arlington County, Virginia
Churches completed in 1894
19th-century Methodist church buildings in the United States
Churches on the National Register of Historic Places in Virginia
National Register of Historic Places in Arlington County, Virginia